This is a list of the municipalities in the province of Soria in the autonomous community of Castile-Leon, Spain.

See also
Geography of Spain
List of cities in Spain

 
Soria